Charon, in Greek mythology, is the ferryman who carried the souls of the dead to the underworld.

Charon may also refer to:

Arts, entertainment, and media
Caronte (album) (Charon), a 1971 album by Italian band The Trip
Charon (band), a Finnish gothic metal band
Charon (CrossGen), a comic book character from CrossGen Entertainment's Sigilverse
Charon (Dungeons & Dragons), a lord of the Yugoloths whose primary function is to provide passage across the River Styx for a steep price
Charon (Marvel Comics), a villainous wizard
Charon (The Three Worlds), a fictional human species from Ian Irvine's arc of novels, The Three Worlds Cycle
Charon, an Eve Online freighter
Charon, a summon from a password-enhanced Golden Sun: The Lost Age and Golden Sun: Dark Dawn
 Charon V, a fictional submarine in Michael Crichton's novel Sphere
Commander Charon, one of the Galactic Commanders from Pokémon Platinum

People with the name
Charon, a Theban military commander (fl. mid-4th century BC); see Androcydes
Charon of Naucratis, a historian 
Charon of Carthage, a historian
Charon of Lampsacus, a historian 
Alexios Charon, early 11th-century Byzantine official
Charon Asetoyer (born 1951), Comanche activist and women's health advocate
Carl Charon (born 1940), former American football player
Jacques Charon (1920–1975), French actor and film director
Jean-Émile Charon (1920–1998), French nuclear physicist, philosopher and writer.  
Joel M. Charon, professor emeritus of sociology at Minnesota State University at Moorhead 
Rita Charon (born 1949), physician and literary scholar 
Viala Charon (1794–1880), French soldier, Governor General of Algeria, Senator of France

Places
Charon (moon), a moon of the dwarf planet Pluto
Charon, Louisiana, United States, an unincorporated community in Vermilion Parish

Science and technology
Charon (gun), an open source 3D-printable gun
Charon (arachnid), a genus of whipspider
Charon (software), a legacy hardware emulator for VAX, Alpha, HP 3000, PDP-11, and SPARC systems
Charon (web browser), a web browser for the Inferno operating system
Blue Origin Charon, the first flight test vehicle of Blue Origin

Other uses
Charon (horse), a racehorse
HMS Charon, several ships of the British Royal Navy

See also
Caron (disambiguation)
Eugenie Margeurite Honoree Charen (1786–1855), French painter
Mona Charen (born 1957), American columnist, political analyst and writer
Charron (disambiguation)
Charun (disambiguation)
Chaeron (disambiguation)